The Hamilton Historic District, in Franklin County, Georgia near Carnesville, Georgia is located on GA 51, approximately .5 mi. NW of jct. with I-85.  It is a  historic district which was listed on the National Register of Historic Places in 1996.  The listing included 13 contributing buildings and three non-contributing ones.

One of the two oldest homes is the Brawner-Kennedy-Hamilton House, built in the 1850s or 1860s.  It is a Plantation Plain-style house with a rear kitchen extension.  It was home of medical Dr. Asa W. Brawner (b.1830), who served as Franklin County's representative to the state General Assembly during the American Civil War.  He was also in the Georgia State
Guard "and was assigned to stay in the area and care for residents and the many young soldiers returning from the war."

References

Historic districts on the National Register of Historic Places in Georgia (U.S. state)
National Register of Historic Places in Franklin County, Georgia
Buildings and structures completed in 1860